The Kitanemuk are an indigenous people of California. They traditionally lived in the Tehachapi Mountains and the Antelope Valley area of the western Mojave Desert of southern California, United States. Today some Kitanemuk people are enrolled in the federally recognized Tejon Indian Tribe of California.

Language
The Kitanemuk traditionally spoke the Kitanemuk language, a Uto-Aztecan language, probably akin to that of the Takic branch and to the Serrano language in particular, as well as the Tongva and Vanyume languages. Alice Anderton reconstructed the dead language in 1988 from Harrington's notes.

Population

Estimates for the pre-contact populations of most native groups in California have varied substantially. Alfred L. Kroeber (1925:883) proposed a population of 1,770  for the Kitanemuk, together with the Serrano and Tataviam, as 3,500. Thomas C. Blackburn and Lowell John Bean (1978:564) estimated the Kitanemuk alone as 500-1,000.

The combined population of the Kitanemuk, Serrano, and Tataviam in 1910 had fallen to only 150 persons, according to Kroeber.

History
The Kitanemuk were first contacted by the Franciscan missionary-explorer Francisco Garcés in 1769. Some Kitanemuk were recruited and relocated for the Spanish missions of Mission San Fernando Rey de España in the San Fernando Valley, Mission San Gabriel Arcángel in the San Gabriel Valley, and perhaps Mission San Buenaventura at the coast in Ventura County. Therefore, they are sometimes grouped with the Mission Indians.

In 1840, a smallpox epidemic hit the Kitanemuk. Beginning in the 1850s, they were associated with the reservations at Fort Tejon and Tule River. By 1917, some Kitanemuks lived on Tejon Ranch and other lived on the Tule River Reservation, located in Tulare County, California.

See also
 Kitanemuk traditional narratives

Notes

References
 
 

Native American tribes in California
California Mission Indians
Antelope Valley
History of the Mojave Desert region
History of Los Angeles County, California
Mojave Desert
Tehachapi Mountains